Nikolai Stepanovich  Gorbachev (May 15, 1948 – April 9, 2019) was a Soviet-born Belarusian sprint canoer who competed in the early to mid-1970s. He won a gold medal in the K-2 1000 m event at the 1972 Summer Olympics in Munich.

Gorbachev also won three medals in the K-4 10000 m event at the ICF Canoe Sprint World Championships with a gold (1974) and two bronzes (1971, 1975).

References

External links

1948 births
People from Rahachow
2019 deaths
Belarusian male canoeists
Communist Party of the Soviet Union members
Canoeists at the 1972 Summer Olympics
Soviet male canoeists
Olympic canoeists of the Soviet Union
Olympic gold medalists for the Soviet Union
Olympic medalists in canoeing
ICF Canoe Sprint World Championships medalists in kayak
Medalists at the 1972 Summer Olympics
Honoured Masters of Sport of the USSR
Sportspeople from Gomel Region